Kathleen Winters (1949–2010) was an American author and aviator.  Originally from Toronto, her family immigrated to Georgia when she was aged six.  She later moved to Minnesota and graduated from Metropolitan State University.

By age 19 she had both commercial pilot and flight instructor licenses.  The holder of several state records for her glider flights, she was married to Jim Hard, a soaring pilot who held numerous records and awards of his own.

She wrote Anne Morrow Lindbergh: First Lady of the Air, a 2006 biography of Charles Lindbergh’s wife, emphasizing the subject's own distinguished aeronautical career. Winters was voted "Best Aviation Writing in 2008" by the Minnesota Aviation Hall of Fame. A second book, Amelia Earhart: The Turbulent Life of an American Icon, was in final preparation at the time of her sudden death from a cerebral hemorrhage.

References

External links
Official website

1949 births
2010 deaths
Writers from Toronto
21st-century American non-fiction writers
American biographers
21st-century Canadian women writers
Glider flight record holders
Commercial aviators
American aviation record holders
American women biographers
American women commercial aviators
Aviators from Georgia (U.S. state)
American women aviation record holders
21st-century American women writers